Goat Peak is a  peak in the North Cascades of Washington, United States. The summit offers broad views of the Methow River valley, as well as many of the other prominent cascade peaks including glaciated Silver Star Mountain. A working US Forest Service fire lookout is located on the summit.

This Goat Peak is one of three summits with the same name in Washington state.

References

External links
 
 

Mountains of Washington (state)
North Cascades of Washington (state)
Mountains of Okanogan County, Washington